, known mononymously as Sana, is a Japanese singer based in South Korea. She is one of three Japanese members of the South Korean girl group Twice, formed in 2015 by JYP Entertainment.

Early life
Sana was born on December 29, 1996 in Tennōji-ku, Osaka, Japan, as an only child.

Sana stated that she wanted to become a singer and dancer early on and was inspired by K-pop groups such as Girls' Generation. In addition to her native Japanese, she speaks Korean.

Career

Pre-debut
Sana began training with EXPG in Osaka in 2009, originally planning to be a singer in Japan, rather than South Korea. During her middle school years, she was scouted by a JYP Entertainment (JYPE) employee at a shopping mall and was invited to participate in the annual JYP Japan audition the following day. Sana passed the audition and joined the JYPE trainee program in South Korea in April 2012. She trained for over three years before her eventual debut with Twice. At one time, she was expected to become a member of a new JYPE girl group; however, this project was cancelled. In 2014, Sana appeared in Got7's music video for "A" as a waitress.

2015–present: Sixteen, Twice, solo activities and MiSaMo

In 2015, Sana participated in the music survival show Sixteen, a reality television series to determine the members of Twice. Out of the sixteen contestants, Sana was selected as one of the nine members of the newly formed girl group. She officially debuted with Twice in October 2015 with the title song "Like Ooh-Ahh" from their debut extended play The Story Begins. Known for her energetic and cheerful personality, she has received recognition in both South Korea and abroad, and her popularity has been credited with helping to improve relations between Japan and South Korea. In Gallup Korea's annual music poll for 2018, Sana was voted the 17th most popular idol in South Korea, the highest-ranked Japanese individual in the poll. She ranked 15th in the 2019 poll. In 2019, Sana also ranked as the most popular female K-pop idol in a survey of soldiers completing mandatory military service in South Korea.

In February 2021, Sana became the first Twice member to release a solo single after she covered "Sotsugyou", a 2020 single by Japanese band Kobukuro. The cover, which includes an a cappella version, was released as a digital single through Warner Music Japan. She released a version with Kobukuro themselves in March 2021.

On February 9, 2023, JYPE announced that Sana, alongside bandmates Momo and Mina, will officially debut in Japan on July 26 as a sub-unit named MiSaMo with an extended play of six tracks. Prior to the trio's debut, on January 25, they released the track “Bouquet” as part of the soundtrack of TV Asahi’s drama series Liaison: Children’s Heart Clinic.

Endorsements
Outside of Twice, Sana was featured in several advertisements and has promoted various brands and products. In 2021, Sana and Twice bandmate Dahyun became models for skincare brand A'pieu. In March 2022, Sana became a model for cosmetic brand Wakemake. As of March 2023, Sana is the ambassador of South Korean makeup brand Espoir.

Discography

Singles

Soundtrack appearances

Songwriting credits
All song credits are adapted from the Korea Music Copyright Association's database unless stated otherwise.

Filmography

Television shows

Bibliography

Photobooks

Notes

References

External links
 

1996 births
Living people
People from Osaka
Musicians from Osaka
K-pop singers
JYP Entertainment artists
Korean-language singers of Japan
Japanese K-pop singers
Japanese women pop singers
21st-century Japanese women singers
21st-century Japanese singers
Twice (group) members
Japanese expatriates in South Korea